Edward James Nugent (February 7, 1904 – January 3, 1995) was an American film and stage actor.

Biography
Born in 1904 in New York City, Nugent appeared in more than 80 films between 1928 and 1937. He subsequently had a second acting career on Broadway. Brooklyn USA (1941), the comedy Junior Miss (1942), and See My Lawyer (1939) were some of his best roles. His next career was as a television producer, writer, and director for American Broadcasting Company. As a child, he sang with the Metropolitan Opera. He died in San Antonio, Texas, on January 3, 1995, at the age of 90.

Selected filmography 

 The Man in Hobbles (1928) - Jake Harris
Our Dancing Daughters (1928) - Freddie
A Single Man (1929) - Dickie
The Flying Fleet (1929) - Midshipman Dizzy (uncredited)
The Bellamy Trial (1929) - Reporter
The Duke Steps Out (1929) - Tommy Wells
The Girl in the Show (1929) - Dave Amazon
Our Modern Maidens (1929) - Reg
Untamed (1929) - Paul
The Vagabond Lover (1929) - Sport
Loose Ankles (1930) - Andy Martin
Clancy in Wall Street (1930) - Donald MacIntosh
Bright Lights (1930) - 'Windy' Jones
War Nurse (1930) - Frank
Remote Control (1930) - Radio Engineer
Three Hollywood Girls (1931, Short)
Girls Demand Excitement (1931) - Tommy
Strangers May Kiss (1931) - 2nd Admirer (uncredited)
Crashing Hollywood (1931, Short)
Shipmates (1931) - What-Ho
Young Sinners (1931) - Bud
Up Pops the Devil (1931) - George Kent
Night Nurse (1931) - Eagan
The Star Witness (1931) - Jackie Leeds
Bought! (1931) - Minor Role (uncredited)
Local Boy Makes Good (1931) - Wally Pierce
A Fool's Advice (1932) - Steve
Behind Stone Walls (1932) - Bob Clay
The Honor of the Press (1932) - Daniel E. Greely
Crooner (1932) - Henry - Band Member
Men Are Such Fools (1932) - Eddie Martin
The Past of Mary Holmes (1933) - Flanagan
42nd Street (1933) - Terry
The Girl in 419 (1933) - Interne (uncredited)
 Dance Hall Hostess (1933) - Patrick Gibbs Jr.
College Humor (1933) - Whistler
This Day and Age (1933) - Don Merrick
Dance Girl Dance (1933) - Joe Pitt
Beauty for Sale (1933) - Bill Merrick
This Side of Heaven (1934) - Vance
She Loves Me Not (1934) - Buzz Jones
No Ransom (1934) - Eddie Winfield
A Girl of the Limberlost (1934) - Phillip Ammon
Lost in the Stratosphere (1934) - Lt. Richard 'Woody' Wood
Girl o' My Dreams (1934) - Larry Haines
Men in White (1934) - (scenes deleted)
Lottery Lover (1935) - Gibbs
Baby Face Harrington (1935) - Albert
Kentucky Blue Streak (1935) - Martin Marion
College Scandal (1935) - Jake Lansing
 Skybound (1935) - Doug Kent
The Old Homestead (1935) - Rudy Nash
Fighting Youth (1935) - Anthony Tonnetti
Forced Landing (1935) - Jim Redfern
Ah, Wilderness! (1935) - Wint Selby
Just My Luck (1935) - Vic Dunne
Dancing Feet (1936) - Jimmy Cassidy
Doughnuts and Society (1936) - Jerry Flannagan
The Harvester (1936) - Bert Munroe
Rio Grande Romance (1936) - Bob Andrews
Bunker Bean (1936) - Mr. Glab
Prison Shadows (1936) - Gene Harris
The Big Game (1936) - Drunk (uncredited)
Pigskin Parade (1936) - Sparks
Two Minutes to Play (1936) - Jack Gaines
A Man Betrayed (1936) - Frank Powell
Put on the Spot (1936) - Bob Andrews (archive footage)
Man of the People (1937) - Edward Spetner
Speed to Spare (1937) - Larry 'Skids' Brannigan 
Island Captives (1937) - Tom Willoughby

References

External links

Edward J. Nugent at Virtual History

1904 births
1995 deaths
American male film actors
Male actors from New York City
20th-century American male actors